The Mayor of Norwalk, Connecticut is the chief executive of the government of Norwalk, Connecticut, as stipulated by the Charter of the City of Norwalk. The current mayor of Norwalk, is Harry Rilling, a Democrat.

Mayors prior to 1913 
Elections were held on the first Monday in October annually up to 1913.

Mayors of the city of South Norwalk from  1870 to 1913 
On August 18, 1870, the settlement of Old Well was incorporated as the city of South Norwalk.

Wardens of the Borough of Norwalk from 1836 to 1872 
The Borough of Norwalk was incorporated on May 4, 1836. The head of the Borough was titled its Warden.

§ Resigned.
§§ Elected to fill the vacancy caused by Edward P. Weed's resignation.
§§§ Elected to fill vacancy caused by James W. Hyatt's resignation.

Mayors of the city of Norwalk from 1893 to 1913 
On June 30, 1893, the Borough of Norwalk was incorporated as the city of Norwalk.

Mayors of the city of Norwalk from 1913 to the present 
The city was consolidated on June 6, 1913. Elections for mayor are held every two years, in odd numbered years. The former city of South Norwalk became the new Norwalk’s Second Taxing District.

See also
 History of Norwalk, Connecticut
 Connecticut's 12th Senate district
 List of members of the Connecticut General Assembly from Norwalk

References

 
Norwalk
History of Norwalk, Connecticut